The 1976 United States presidential election in Connecticut took place on November 2, 1976. All 50 states and The District of Columbia, were part of the 1976 United States presidential election. Connecticut voters chose eight electors to the Electoral College, who voted for president and vice president.

Connecticut was won by the Republican nominees, incumbent President Gerald Ford of Michigan and his running mate Senator Bob Dole of Kansas. Ford and Dole defeated the Democratic nominees, Governor Jimmy Carter of Georgia and his running mate Senator Walter Mondale of Minnesota.

Ford narrowly carried Connecticut with 52.06% of the vote to Carter's 46.90%, a victory margin of 5.16%.  , Carter is the most recent Democrat to win the presidency without carrying Connecticut. The state would not vote for a losing candidate again until 2000, and for the loser of the popular vote until 2004. 

Carter is the only Democrat to win the White House without carrying New Haven County since James Buchanan in 1856. He also became the first Democrat to win without the town of Naugatuck since 1844, the first to win without the town of Brooklyn since 1892, and the first to win without Ansonia since 1912. This is the only election between 1912 and 2016 in which it voted differently from Pennsylvania. This is also the most recent election that Connecticut voted more Republican than Florida, Nevada, Oklahoma, South Dakota, Texas, and Virginia.

Results

By county

See also
 United States presidential elections in Connecticut

References

Connecticut
1976
1976 Connecticut elections